Phaeogymnocellida is an order of cercozoans in the class Phaeodarea.

References

External links 
 

 Phaeogymnocellida at the World Register of Marine Spacies (WoRMS)

Phaeodaria
Cercozoa orders